The 1950 Memorial Cup final was the 32nd junior ice hockey championship of the Canadian Amateur Hockey Association. The George Richardson Memorial Trophy champions Montreal Junior Canadiens of the Quebec Junior Hockey League in Eastern Canada competed against the Abbott Cup champions Regina Pats of the Western Canada Junior Hockey League in Western Canada. In a best-of-seven series, held at the Montreal Forum in Montreal, Quebec and Maple Leaf Gardens in Toronto, Ontario, Montreal won its first Memorial Cup, defeating Regina 4 games to 1.

Scores
Game 1: Montreal 8–7 Regina (in Montreal)
Game 2: Montreal 5–2 Regina (in Montreal)
Game 3: Montreal 5–1 Regina (in Toronto)
Game 4: Regina 7–4 Montreal (in Toronto)
Game 5: Montreal 6–3 Regina (in Montreal)

Winning roster

Doug Binning, Kevin Conway, Bob Dawson, Herb English, Bill Goold, Reg Grigg, Charles Hodge, Gordon Hollingworth, Don Marshall, Dave McCready, Brian McKay, Dickie Moore, Roger Morissette, Bill Sinnett, Ernie Roche, Kevin Rochford, Art Rose.  Coaches: Sam Pollock, Bill Reay.

References

External links
 Memorial Cup 
 Canadian Hockey League

1949–50 in Canadian ice hockey
Memorial Cup tournaments
Ice hockey competitions in Montreal
Ice hockey competitions in Toronto
1950 in Quebec
1950 in Ontario